Patricia Cahill  may refer to:
 Patricia Cahill (drug smuggler)
 Patricia Cahill (singer)